Gymnothorax ryukyuensis is a species of fish from the genus Gymnothorax. It is native to the Pacific ocean in the Ryukyu Islands. This tan colored fish has dark spots and patches around its body, and it has a total vertebrae of 133–134. It is most closely related to G. flavimarginatus.

References 

ryukyuensis
Fish described in 2003